The 1983 Girabola was the fifth season of top-tier football competition in Angola. Petro de Luanda were the defending champions.

The league comprised 14 teams, the bottom three of which were relegated.

Estrela Clube Primeiro de Maio were crowned champions, winning their 1st title, while Académica do Lobito, Andorinhas do Sumbe and Construtores de Malanje were relegated.

Joseph Maluka of Primeiro de Maio finished as the top scorer with 17 goals.

Changes from the 1982 season
Relegated: Inter da Huíla, M.C.H. do Uíge, Sagrada Esperança
Promoted: Andorinhas do Sumbe, Construtores de Malanje, Petro do Huambo

Legal cases
Desportivo da Chela was awarded a 2–0 default win in their 9th round home match against Progresso do Sambizanga.

Primeiro de Agosto contested their 4th round 2–1 away match defeat against 1º de Maio. D'Agosto was awarded the right for a rematch. In the rematch, they beat De Maio 3–4.

Académica do Lobito was awarded a 3–0 win by default in their 19th round home match against 1º de Agosto. D'Agosto had travelled to Mozambique for a friendly match against local side Matchedje.

Académica do Lobito was awarded a 3–0 win by default in their 23rd round home match against Mambroa for the latter fielding an ineligible player. Mambroa had originally won 0–1.

League table

Results

Season statistics

Top scorers

Most goals scored in a single match

Champions

External links
Federação Angolana de Futebol

Angola
Angola
Girabola seasons